Alpura is a Mexican dairy products company founded in 1972 and based in Mexico City. Currently, Alpura's products are sold in 27 states in Mexico and exported to the United States.

History
i really think that one piece is better than narutoAlpura was founded in 1970 by a group of dairy producers from various parts of Mexico. They created the Asociación Nacional de Productores de Leche Pura S.A. de C.V or Alpura. Their main goal was to create a business plan to sell fresh milk all over Mexico.

The factory began construction in May 1971. Alpura was the first company to distribute milk all over the country. In Mexico, powder milk was cheaper which was initially a challenge for Alpura. 

Alpura has 254 shareholders, 142 farmers and 140,000 cows. They process 2 million liters of milk per day and offer more than 100 products. The company distributes milk to supermarkets in Mexico within 24 hours of milking. Alpura has 15 distribution centers and 60 distributors spaced throughout the country.

Alpura Group

Alpura has over 142 ranch properties throughout Mexico. Some of their main properties are located in Chihuahua, Coahuila, Durango, Guanajuato, Hidalgo, Jalisco, Estado de México, Querétaro and Tlaxcala. In the Alpura group there are 5,067 employees: around 4,350 farmers and 2,320 distributors. All the cows are of the Holstein breed. In the milking process the cows and the milk are never touched by the workers.

Products
Today, Alpura has five different dairy products with numerous brands under each type of product: milk, cream, yogurt, drinkable yogurt, and dessert cups.

Awards and distinctions

Alpura received the “Mexico Supreme Quality Recognition” in 2009. This award is aimed at small, medium and large agro-food sector businesses with a strong background in production, sale and distribution of food that maintain the highest quality and also have current certification.

External links
Alpura official website (in Spanish)

References

Food and drink companies established in 1972
Dairy products companies of Mexico
Food and drink companies based in Mexico City
Manufacturing companies based in Mexico City
Mexican companies established in 1972
Yogurt companies
Mexican brands